Jingziguan is a town in Xichuan County, Nanyang City, Henan province, Central China.

Geography
Jingziguan is located at the junction of Henan province, Shaanxi province and Hubei province of Central China.

Gallery

Xichuan County
Towns in Nanyang, Henan